Fattiwala is a small village in the Punjab province of Pakistan. It is situated near Sutlej River in Kasur District, on the Indian border. It is very small village having approximately 1500 persons.

Populated places in Kasur District